The 1984 Gent–Wevelgem was the 46th edition of the Gent–Wevelgem cycle race and was held on 4 April 1984. The race started in Ghent and finished in Wevelgem. The race was won by Guido Bontempi of the Carrera team.

General classification

References

Gent–Wevelgem
1984 in road cycling
1984 in Belgian sport
1984 Super Prestige Pernod International